Kamil Mokrzki (born 29 October 1991) is a Polish handball player for Gwardia Opole and the Polish national team.

References

1991 births
Living people
Polish male handball players